Gardner Read (January 2, 1913 in Evanston, Illinois – November 10, 2005 in Manchester-by-the-Sea, Massachusetts) was an American composer and musical scholar.

His first musical studies were in piano and organ, and he also took lessons in counterpoint and composition at the School of Music at Northwestern University. In 1932 he was awarded a four-year scholarship to the Eastman School of Music (B.M. and M.M.), where he studied with Bernard Rogers and Howard Hanson. In the late 1930s he also studied briefly with Ildebrando Pizzetti, and Aaron Copland.

After heading the composition departments of the St. Louis Institute of Music, the Kansas City Conservatory of Music and the Cleveland Institute of Music, Read became Composer-in-Residence and Professor of Composition at the School of Music at Boston University. He remained in this post until his retirement in 1978.

His Symphony No. 1, op. 30 (1937, premiered by Sir John Barbirolli) won first prize at the New York Philharmonic-Symphony Society's American Composers' Contest, while his second symphony (op. 45, 1943) won first prize in the Paderewski Fund Competition. Another first prize came in the 1986 National Association of Teachers of Singing Art Song Competition, won by his Nocturnal Visions, op. 145. He wrote one opera, Villon, in 1967.

His book Music Notation: A Manual of Modern Practice (1969/1979) attempted to catalogue the rapidly changing landscape of notation for contemporary western art music.

Bibliography
Dodd, Mary Ann, and Jayson Rod Engquist (1996). Gardner Read: A Bio-Bibliography. Greenwood Press.  .  (Contains a complete list of his compositions.)
Read, Gardner (1953, rev. 1969).  Thesaurus of Orchestral Devices. Pittman Publishing Corp.  
 -- (1964, rev. 1972).  Music Notation: A Manual of Modern Practice.  Crescendo Publishing, (1964, 1972); Taplinger Publishing Company (1979, 2nd edition).  
 -- (1975, 1993).  Contemporary Instrumental Techniques.  Schirmer Books, 1975.  ASIN 0028721004.  Revised as Compendium of Modern Instrumental Techniques.  Greenwood Press, 1993.  
 -- (1978).  Modern Rhythmic Notation.  Indiana University Press. ASIN 0253338670
 -- (1979).  Style and Orchestration.  Schirmer Books/MacMillan Publishing Company, 1979.  
 -- (1987).  Source Book of Proposed Music Notation Reforms.  Greenwood Press.  
 -- (1990).  Twentieth Century Microtonal Notation.  Greenwood Press.  
 -- (1998).  Pictographic Score Notation.  Greenwood Press.  
 -- (2004).  Orchestral Combinations: The Science and Art of Instrumental Tone Color.  Scarecrow Press, Inc.

External links

Gardner Read official site
Interview with Gardner Read, June 4, 1987

20th-century classical composers
American male classical composers
American classical composers
Bienen School of Music alumni
Concert band composers
Eastman School of Music alumni
University of Missouri–Kansas City faculty
Cleveland Institute of Music faculty
American opera composers
Male opera composers
Musicians from Evanston, Illinois
1913 births
2005 deaths
Writers from Evanston, Illinois
Pupils of Bernard Rogers
20th-century American composers
Classical musicians from Illinois
20th-century American male musicians
Albany Records artists